Andriy Kulyk (born 30 August 1989) is a Ukrainian cyclist, who most recently rode for UCI Continental team .

Personal life
Kulyk was born in Sumy. His father, Oleksandr Kulyk, was the former manager of the Ukrainian national cycling team; he was killed in March 2022 during the 2022 Russian invasion of Ukraine.

Major results

2010
 1st Stage 6 Bałtyk–Karkonosze Tour
2011
 8th Central European Tour Budapest GP
2012
 Tour of Romania
1st Stages 2, 4 & 6
 6th Central European Tour Budapest GP
 9th Central European Tour Miskolc GP
2013
 4th Central European Tour Budapest GP
 8th Overall Baltic Chain Tour
2014
 1st Stage 5 Okolo Slovenska
 2nd Grand Prix of Moscow
 7th Overall Tour of China II
 7th Race Horizon Park 2
2015
 1st  Overall Baltic Chain Tour
1st Stage 2
 1st Stage 1 Szlakiem Grodów Piastowskich
 7th Korona Kocich Gór
 8th Overall Tour of China II
 8th Memoriał Romana Siemińskiego
 9th Memorial Grundmanna I Wizowskiego
 10th Sochi Cup
2016
 1st GP Slovakia
 1st Stage 2a (TTT) Tour of Ukraine
2017
 1st Stage 2 Bałtyk–Karkonosze Tour
 Visegrad 4 Bicycle Race
4th GP Slovakia
9th GP Czech Republic
 5th Memoriał Henryka Łasaka
2019
 1st  Road race, National Road Championships
 3rd Grand Prix Velo Alanya
 5th Minsk Cup
2020
 5th Grand Prix Side
 7th Grand Prix Mount Erciyes
 10th GP Antalya
2021
 3rd Road race, National Road Championships
 3rd GP Manavgat
 10th Grand Prix Gazipaşa

References

External links

1989 births
Living people
Ukrainian male cyclists
Sportspeople from Sumy Oblast